Satish a/l Krishnan (born 28 September 1994) is a Malaysian professional footballer who plays as a forward but can also plays as an attacking midfielder. He's currently plays for Malaysia Super League club Petaling Jaya City FC.

Club career
Born and raised in Kuala Selangor, Satish began his career with Selangor youth team in 2012. In 2014, Satish has been loaned to Malaysia youth team Harimau Muda A.

In 2016, Satish signed one-year contract with PKNS FC. In July 2016, he was loaned to AirAsia FC until end of the season.

On 18 December 2016, Satish returned to Selangor for a second stint after his contract with PKNS FC expired. Satish made his league debut for Selangor in a 5–3 defeat to PKNS FC coming off the bench in Shah Alam Stadium on 4 February 2017.

References

External links
 

1994 births
Living people
Malaysian footballers
Selangor FA players
PKNS F.C. players
Petaling Jaya Rangers F.C. players
Malaysia Super League players
Tamil sportspeople
Malaysian people of Tamil descent
Association football forwards
Association football midfielders